Lower Market Street Historic District is a national historic district located at Wilmington, New Castle County, Delaware. It encompasses 132 contributing buildings the central business district of Wilmington.  It includes attached commercial and commercial/residential structures dating from the mid-18th to the early-20th century.  The buildings reflect a variety of popular architectural styles including Classical Revival, Greek Revival, Federal, and Art Deco. Notable buildings include the Farmers Bank (1912), Jake's Market (c. 1870), Wilmington and Brandywine Bank, Joshua Conner and Sons, J.T. Montgomery Jewelry Store, and Wilmington Publishing Company Building.

It was added to the National Register of Historic Places in 1980, with a boundary increase in 1985.

References

Commercial buildings on the National Register of Historic Places in Delaware
Federal architecture in Delaware
Greek Revival architecture in Delaware
Neoclassical architecture in Delaware
Art Deco architecture in Delaware
Historic districts in Wilmington, Delaware
Historic districts on the National Register of Historic Places in Delaware
National Register of Historic Places in Wilmington, Delaware